Saints Phileas and Philoromus (died ) were two Egyptian martyrs under the Emperor Diocletian. Phileas was Bishop of Thmuis and Philoromus was a senior imperial officer.

Monks of Ramsgate account

The monks of St Augustine's Abbey, Ramsgate wrote in their Book of Saints (1921),

Butler's account

The hagiographer Alban Butler (1710–1773) wrote in his Lives of the Fathers, Martyrs, and Other Principal Saints,

Lardner's account

Nathaniel Lardner (1684–1768) in his Credibility of the Gospel History wrote,

Notes

Sources

 
 
 

Saints from Roman Egypt
306 deaths